Maa Khadgeshwari Kali Mandir is a Hindu temple dedicated to Goddess Kali. It is a part of Hindu pilgrimage and located in Araria, in Araria district of Bihar, India.

The temple is visited by Hindus from Bihar, Jharkhand, West Bengal and neighboring country Nepal with the hope that Maa Kali will fulfill their wishes. 

Special prayers are held every Tuesday and Saturday wherein "Kheer" or "Khichdi" is offered to Kali maa as prasad by her devotees and is distributed among all.

The height of the temple , which makes it tallest Kali temple of the world. 

The main temple along with Lord Shiva is situated in the same premises.

History
In 1884, the idol of the goddess was initially kept in a Jhopadi. In the early days, locals started worshipping by visiting the temple. The present priest and patron of the temple Sarojanand Dixit (Popularly known as Nanu Baba), a former football player, holds the overall managememnt and worshiping work of the temple since early 1970s. His initiative to build the tallest Kali Temple of Asia at the same place started in 1987. The construction work of the temple completed on 2011 through donations, crowdsource funding, and public charity

References 

Hindu temples in Bihar